In politics, a proposition is a rarely used term to designate political parties, factions, and individuals in a legislature who are favorable and supportive of the incumbent government, as against the opposition. 

A proposition is also a popular initiative, viz a measure or proposed legislation "proposed" to the members of a legislature or to voters, in a direct popular plebiscite, for their approval. In the US American phenomenon of popular plebiscites, propositions can take the form of an initiative or a referendum; for example, see the list of California ballot propositions.

A proposition may also be a debate team that supports and tries to prove a motion.

Political terminology